Museum Mile London is the home of 14 museums in London, England, in the area between Bloomsbury  to the north and the Embankment on the River Thames to the south.

The area is located in the London Borough of Camden. The route includes Woburn Place, Russell Square, Southampton Row, Kingsway, and the Aldwych.

The museums and related cultural institutions with collections that are included are:

 The British Museum
 The Brunei Gallery, SOAS
 The Cartoon Museum
 Charles Dickens Museum
 The Courtauld Gallery
 The Foundling Museum
 Hunterian Museum at the Royal College of Surgeons
 Museum of Freemasonry
 London Transport Museum
 Sir John Soane's Museum
 University College London museums and collections including:
Petrie Museum of Egyptian Archaeology
Grant Museum of Zoology and Comparative Anatomy
UCL Art Museum
 Wellcome Collection

Museum Mile London's role is to establish new connections between people and its collections, so they can benefit everyone. It wants to spark people's curiosity, enticing them to explore new works, stories and spaces, amongst collections that capture every interest. It also provides a space for museum staff to connect and share ideas.

See also
 Albertopolis, in South Kensington, London
 List of museums in London
Knowledge Quarter, London

References

External links
 Museum Mile website

2007 establishments in England
Museum districts in the United Kingdom
Art gallery districts
Culture in London
Museum Mile
Museum Mile
Tourist attractions in London
London, Museum Mile
Museum Mile
Geography of the London Borough of Camden